42nd Brigade or 42nd Infantry Brigade may refer to:

 42nd Indian Brigade of the British Indian Army in the First World War
 42nd Military Police Brigade (United States), a unit of the United States Army 

 United Kingdom
 42nd Infantry Brigade (United Kingdom)
 Artillery Brigades
 42nd Brigade Royal Field Artillery

See also
 42nd Division (disambiguation)
 42nd Regiment (disambiguation)
 42nd Squadron (disambiguation)